Mark Gimenez is an author and lawyer from Texas. He specializes in the thriller genre writing, especially legal thrillers. His first novel, The Color of Law, was a New York Times bestseller. He also runs his own solo law practice.

Biography 
Gimenez grew up in La Marque, Galveston County, Texas. He studied Political Science at Southwest Texas State University in San Marcos, Texas, and earned a B.A. with honors. He then attended Notre Dame Law School in Indiana and earned a J.D. degree magna cum laude in 1980.

He practiced law with a large Dallas law firm and became a partner. After ten years he left to practice solo and to write. He lives outside Fort Worth, Texas with his wife and two sons.

Books 
The Color of Law, A. Scott Fenney Book 1 (2005) 
The Abduction (aka Saving Grace) (2007) 
The Perk (2008) 
The Common Lawyer (2009) 
Accused, A. Scott Fenney Book 2 (2010) 
Con Law: John Bookman 1 (2013) 
The Governor's Wife (2013) 
The Case Against William (2014) 
Parts & Labor: The Adventures of Max Dugan (2015) 
The Absence of Guilt, A. Scott Fenney Book 3 (2016) 
End of Days: Con Law II - John Bookman 2 (2017)

References

External links

Living people
Texas lawyers
Novelists from Texas
People from La Marque, Texas
Notre Dame Law School alumni
American male novelists
Year of birth missing (living people)